This is a list of films released by StudioCanal or associated companies.

1990s

2000s

2010s

2020s

References 

Lists of films by studio